Aulzhausen is a village in the municipality of Affing near Augsburg (8 km) in the district of Aichach-Friedberg, in Swabia - Bavaria, southern Germany.

Geographie 
Aulzhausen is located on State Road 2035 (Augsburg - Neuburg). It is approximately six kilometers away from the A8 motorway Augsburg-East or  Augsburg Airport and about eight kilometers away from Augsburg.

Partnership 
 Parish Aulzhausen and Parish Łobez (Poland), since 1994

Cemetery monument 
The St. Laurence and Elizabeth Catholic Cemetery monument inscribed "Bete für die Verstorbenen und wirke für den Frieden" Translation: "Pray for the dead and act for peace." Another marker there says, "Den Gefallenen zum Gedenken" ("In order to remember the fallen")  Chart showing that "11 fell 1914-18, 36 fell 1939-45, 6 missing 1939-45."

External links 
  Picture of Aulzhausen - (Affing)
  Map of Aulzhausen  - (BayernAtlas)
  Forced laborer justifies partnership between Aulzhausen and Łobez - (Grabler)
 St. Laurence and Elizabeth Cemetery monument - (Grabler)
  St. Laurence and Elizabeth Cemetery monument - (Kriegsopfer.org)

Aichach-Friedberg